Akbar Kalili (1956 – 28 February 2018) was an Iranian alpine skier. He competed in three events at the 1976 Winter Olympics.

References

External links
 

1956 births
2018 deaths
Iranian male alpine skiers
Olympic alpine skiers of Iran
Alpine skiers at the 1976 Winter Olympics